Mohamed Ali Ben Moussa (born 5 April 1954) is a Tunisian football forward who played for Tunisia in the 1978 FIFA World Cup. He also played for Club Africain.

References

External links
FIFA profile

1954 births
Tunisian footballers
Tunisia international footballers
Association football forwards
Club Africain players
1978 FIFA World Cup players
Living people